John Sawry (died 1664) was an English politician who sat in the House of Commons in 1653.

Sawry was of Plumpton, Lancashire and was a colonel in the service of the Commonwealth. In 1653, he was nominated as Member of Parliament for Lancashire in the Barebones Parliament.

References

Year of birth missing
1664 deaths
English MPs 1653 (Barebones)
People from the Borough of Fylde
Roundheads
Members of the Parliament of England (pre-1707) for Lancashire